Marcos Ovejero (born November 23, 1986 in La Plata, Argentina) is an Argentine footballer currently playing for Universitario of the Primera División in Bolivia.

Teams
  Independiente Rivadavia 2008
  Defensores de Belgrano 2009
  Flandria 2010
  Guabirá 2011
  Universitario 2011
  La Paz FC 2012
  Sport Boys 2013

References
 Profile at BDFA 
 

1986 births
Living people
Argentine footballers
Argentine expatriate footballers
Association football forwards
Independiente Rivadavia footballers
Defensores de Belgrano footballers
Universitario de Sucre footballers
Guabirá players
Expatriate footballers in Bolivia
Footballers from La Plata